Joseph Geens was a Belgian sports shooter. He competed in the team 300 metre free rifle event at the 1908 Summer Olympics.

References

Year of birth missing
Year of death missing
Belgian male sport shooters
Olympic shooters of Belgium
Shooters at the 1908 Summer Olympics
Place of birth missing